The 1937 Toledo Rockets football team was an American football team that represented Toledo University in the Ohio Athletic Conference (OAC) during the 1937 college football season. In their second season under head coach Clarence Spears, the Rockets compiled a 6–3 record.

Schedule

References

Toledo
Toledo Rockets football seasons
Toledo Rockets football